John Elmer McKeen was the former CEO of Pfizer. John Elmer McKeen graduated from Brooklyn Polytechnic Institute (now NYU Polytechnic School of Engineering) in 1926 as a chemical engineer and immediately went to work for Pfizer. He was an elected member of the National Academy of Engineering

References

Polytechnic Institute of New York University alumni